The women's team soft tennis event was part of the soft tennis programme and took place between November 13 and 14, at the Tianhe Tennis School.

Schedule
All times are China Standard Time (UTC+08:00)

Results

Preliminary round

Group A

Group B

Knockout round

Semifinals

Final

References 

Official website

External links 
soft-tennis.org

Soft tennis at the 2010 Asian Games